Iridomyrmex gumnos is a species of ant in the genus Iridomyrmex. Described by Heterick and Shattuck in 2011, the biology of the ant remains unknown, but it is distributed in South Australia and New South Wales.

Etymology
The specific epithet (gumnos) is said to be Latin for nude. In classical Latin, the proper word for "nude" is nudus. The ancient Greek word for "nude" is however gumnos (γυμνός).

References

Iridomyrmex
Hymenoptera of Australia
Insects described in 2011